Antonio Tobias Mendez (born 1963) is an American sculptor.

Works

Mendez has produced over twenty public monuments: his sculptures include Thurgood Marshall, Don Shula, Mohandas Gandhi, Major Taylor, and part of the United States Navy Memorial. In 2011, Mendez was nominated as one of the three finalists to complete the Bill Russell statue in the city of Boston at the City Hall Plaza. He also created bronze sculptures of the six Baltimore Orioles greats whose uniform numbers were retired by the ballclub, which are located in the picnic area behind the bullpens beyond left-center field at Camden Yards.

Personal life
Toby Mendez is the son of author and former CIA operative Tony Mendez and half-brother of Jesse Mendez, son of Tony and Jonna Mendez (herself former CIA Chief of Disguise).

References

External links

ipernity: Tag Antonio Tobias Mendez, Sculptor

Living people
20th-century American sculptors
1963 births
Hispanic and Latino American artists
21st-century American sculptors
Artists from Denver
Sculptors from Colorado